John Robert Hoffman, most often known simply as John Hoffman, is an American actor, screenwriter, director and producer. He wrote and co-starred in the Disney Channel original film Northern Lights (1997) and has written many unproduced screenplays, including Queen Bess, Indianapolis, In Harm's Way and Queen of the Jews.

Hoffman made his theatrical film debut (as both writer and director) with the MGM/Jim Henson Pictures comedy Good Boy! (2003), which opened at No. 3 at the U.S. box office and grossed $45.3 million worldwide on an $18 million budget. He was nominated for a Primetime Emmy Award as part of the writing team for the 81st Academy Awards (2009). Hoffman has also contributed, as both a writer and producer, to the HBO series Looking (2014–2015) and the Netflix series Grace and Frankie (2016–2022). In 2021, Hoffman co-created the hit Hulu original series Only Murders in the Building, alongside Steve Martin.

Hoffman played the Mad Hatter in Disney's Adventures in Wonderland (1992–1995).

Filmography
Attack of the 5 Ft. 2 In. Women (1994) as Jeff Googooly
Fortune Hunter (1994) as Harry Flack
Adventures in Wonderland (1992–94) as Mad Hatter / Copy-Catter Hatter
Courthouse (1995) as Morgan / Justine's Assistant
The Larry Sanders Show (1996) as David
Northern Lights (1997) as Joe Scarlotti
Only Murders in the Building (2021), series co-created with Steve Martin

References

External links
 
 

Living people
American male film actors
American male television actors
American male stage actors
Male actors from New York (state)
American gay writers
American LGBT screenwriters
LGBT producers
Year of birth missing (living people)